Born in 68 (original title: Nés en 68) is a 2008 French drama film directed by Olivier Ducastel and Jacques Martineau. The film has the sub-title 'Nous nous aimerons jusqu'à la mort' ('We will love each other until death').

Plot summary
In 1968 Catherine, Yves and Hervé are 20, all students in Paris; the May revolt up-ends their lives. They attempt to form their own community with friends on an abandoned farm in the Lot. Their need for freedom and individual fulfilment leads them to make choices which separates them in the end with Catherine alone remaining at the farm. In 1989 the children of Catherine and Yves become adults in a world that has profoundly changed: with the end of communism and the AIDS epidemic, they revisit the militant legacy of the previous generation. Much like their parents before them, they begin to question the generation that preceded them, while fighting for a better world than the one into which they were born.

Cast
Laetitia Casta as Catherine
Yannick Renier as Yves
Yann Trégouët as Hervé
Christine Citti as Maryse
Marc Citti as Serge
Édouard Collin as Christophe
Fejria Deliba as Dalila
Gaëtan Gallier as Michel
Sabrina Seyvecou as Ludmilla, the daughter of Catherine and Yves
Théo Frilet as Boris, the son of Catherine and Yves
Osman Elkharraz as Joseph, the son of Dalila and Michel
Slimane Yefsah as Farivar, Ludmilla's husband
Matthias Van Khache as Jean-Paul
Thibault Vinçon as Vincent, friend of Boris
Marilyne Canto as Dominique, Yves's partner
Alain Fromager as Antoine, Catherine's friend
Sophie Barjac as Catherine's mother
Pierre-Loup Rajot as Catherine's father

Awards and nominations
Cabourg Film Festival
Golden Swann - Best Actress (Laetitia Casta) and Best Male Newcomer (Yannick Renier).

Release
Originally finished as two 100-minute episodes which were scheduled on Arte, and France 2 during 2009, a 170-minute shorter version was offered to the Cannes Film Festival organizers, in relation to the 40th anniversary of the 1968 events.
A DVD of this cinema version was released in 2010.

References

External links
 

2008 films
Films directed by Olivier Ducastel
Films directed by Jacques Martineau
Films set in France
Films set in 1968
Films set in 1989
May 1968 events in France
2008 LGBT-related films
French LGBT-related films
HIV/AIDS in French films
2000s French-language films
2000s French films